The Town of Silverthorne is a home rule municipality in Summit County, Colorado. According to the 2010 Census, the population of the city is 3,887.

History
The town was named for Judge Marshall Silverthorn who served as the judge of the miners' court in Breckenridge. The judge first came to town as a prospector and claimed a section of the Blue River in 1881. After patenting his claim in April 1882, he was disappointed to find the gold to be sparse and the claim a poor bet. The land passed to his daughters on his death in 1887 and was then sold several times to various mining companies. In 1953 Clayton Hill bought the property and subdivided it for homes and stores.

Silverthorne served as a makeshift camp for workers during the construction of the Dillon Reservoir from 1961–1963, and later as a stop along Interstate 70. It was eventually incorporated on April 5, 1967.

The city has expanded several times since incorporation by annexation.

Since 2016, the town of Silverthorne has hosted the Silverthon Games, an annual competition featuring a seasonally-based slate of individual and team events, culminating with the heavily-spectated Hummingbird Circle race.

Geography
The town is situated between the Gore Range to the west and the Continental Divide to the east. The two most visible mountains are Buffalo and Red Mountains. Also surrounding the valley are Ptarmigan, Tenderfoot, and Ten Mile Peaks.

Climate
Silverthorne has a highland-influenced subpolar climate (Köppen (Dfc) with warm summer days, cold nights year round, as well as cold and snowy winter days.

Demographics

As of the census of 2000, there were 3,196 people, 1,103 households, and 736 families residing in the town. The racial makeup of the town was 82.17% White, 1.00% African American, 0.66% Native American, 0.75% Asian, 0.28% Pacific Islander, 11.17% from other races, and 3.97% from two or more races. Hispanic or Latino of any race were 23.50% of the population.

There were 1,103 households, out of which 36.2% had children under the age of 18 living with them, 53.0% were married couples living together, 6.7% had a female householder with no husband present, and 33.2% were non-families. 13.8% of all households were made up of individuals, and 0.5% had someone living alone who was 65 years of age or older. The average household size was 2.90 and the average family size was 3.14.

In the town, the population was spread out, with 23.1% under the age of 18, 14.8% from 18 to 24, 42.3% from 25 to 44, 17.8% from 45 to 64, and 2.0% who were 65 years of age or older. The median age was 30 years. For every 100 females, there were 130.4 males. For every 100 females age 18 and over, there were 140.7 males.

The median income for a household in the town was $58,839, and the median income for a family was $61,715. Males had a median income of $31,983 versus $27,172 for females. The per capita income for the town was $24,271. About 2.9% of families and 7.2% of the population were below the poverty threshold, including 6.1% of those under age 18, but none were age 65 or over.

Notable people
Notable individuals who were born in or have lived in Silverthorne include:
 Dan Gibbs (1976- ), Colorado state legislator
 Mike Potekhen (1979- ), race car driver
 Red Gerard (2000- ), Olympic gold medalist snowboarder.

See also

Outline of Colorado
Index of Colorado-related articles
State of Colorado
Colorado cities and towns
Colorado municipalities
Colorado counties
Summit County, Colorado
Colorado metropolitan areas
Blue River
Dillon Reservoir
White River National Forest

References

External links

 Town of Silverthorne website
 CDOT map of the Town of Silverthorne

Towns in Summit County, Colorado
Towns in Colorado